Keene may refer to:

Places 
In Canada
 Keene, Ontario, a small community in Ontario, Canada

In the United States
 Keene, California, a census-designated place
 Keene, Kansas, an unincorporated community
 Keene, Kentucky, a city
 Keene, Nebraska, an unincorporated community
 Keene, New Hampshire, city and county seat of Cheshire County
 Keene, New York, a town
 Keene, North Dakota, an unincorporated community
 Keene, Ohio, an unincorporated community
 Keene, Texas, a city
 Keene, Virginia, an unincorporated town community
 Keene, Wisconsin, an unincorporated community
 Keene Township (disambiguation)
 Keene Pond, pond in Duxbury, Massachusetts

In education 
 Keene State College, an institution of the University System of New Hampshire
 Keene High School, public high school located in Keene, New Hampshire
 Keene Independent School District, public school district based in Keene, Texas

People 
 Keene (surname), people with that name
 Keene Fitzpatrick (1864-1944),  American track coach, athletic trainer, professor of physical training and gymnasium director considered "one of the pioneers of intercollegiate sport"

Other uses 
 Keene/Elmhirst's Resort Airport, airport near Keene, Ontario
 Keene & Simpson, American architectural firm
 Keene Swamp Bats, collegiate summer baseball team based in Keene, New Hampshire
 Keene, 1969 film starring Joseph Cotten

See also 
 Keen (disambiguation)
 Kene, a given name and surname
 Keane (disambiguation)
 Keenes, Illinois
 Keeney (surname)